King's Arms, or Kings Arms or The King's Arms may refer to:

King's Arms, a popular Pub name
Kings Arms, Hanwell, London, England
Kings Arms, Combe Martin, Devon, England, now known as Pack o' Cards
Kings Arms, Leaves Green, Bromley, London, England
King's Arms, Oxford, England
King's Arms, Waterloo, London, England
Kings Arms, Woolwich, London, England
Kings Arms, York, England
The Old Kings Arms, St Albans, England
King's Arms, Dumfries, a tavern with one of Robert Burns's diamond point engravings

See also
King of Arms
Royal Arms of England
Royal coat of arms of the United Kingdom